Michael Thomas Prendergast (December 15, 1888 – November 18, 1967) was a pitcher in Major League Baseball.  His nickname during his playing years was "Iron Mike".

He was born on December 15, 1888 in Arlington, Illinois.  Mike's parents were Jeremiah Prendergast and Catherine Louise Corcoran, both natives of County Waterford, Ireland.
 
In 1914 and 1915, he pitched for the Chicago Whales of the Federal League. When the Federal League ceased operations in 1915 and merged with the Chicago Cubs, Mike joined the Cubs organization.  He pitched with the Cubs in 1916 and 1917.  After the 1917 season, he was traded to the Philadelphia Phillies where he played in 1918 and 1919.

After his retirement from baseball Mike and his wife relocated to Omaha, Nebraska and Mike worked at Falstaff Brewery.

In 1932, Mike won the Omaha Ping Pong championship.

He died in Omaha on November 18, 1967 and is buried in Calvary Cemetery in Omaha.

Mike's younger brother, Jeremiah "Jerry" Prendergast, nicknamed Jade, also played some minor league baseball.

References

External links

1888 births
1967 deaths
Baseball players from Illinois
Major League Baseball pitchers
Chicago Whales players
Chicago Cubs players
Philadelphia Phillies players
People from Bureau County, Illinois
Minor league baseball managers
Pekin Celestials players
Galesburg Boosters players
Bloomington Bloomers players
Peoria Distillers players
Quincy Infants players
Toronto Maple Leafs (International League) players